Knud Iversen Øyen (12 May 1865 – 14 November 1942) was a Norwegian jurist and politician of the Conservative Party. He was a member of the cabinet Lykke, heading the Ministry of Justice from 1926 to 1928. He served as County Governor of Hedmark from 1926 to 1935.

References

1865 births
1942 deaths
Government ministers of Norway
County governors of Norway
Ministers of Justice of Norway